Domingo Cordero Clase (born 17 October 1965 in Santo Domingo, Dominican Republic) is a retired Puerto Rican track and field athlete who specialized in the 400 metres hurdles. His personal best time was 49.12 seconds, achieved in July 1991 in Xalapa. This was the Puerto Rican record.

He won gold medals at the 1990 and 1993 Central American and Caribbean Games as well as the 1989 and 1991 Central American and Caribbean Championships. He won the bronze medal at the 1993 Central American and Caribbean Championships and the silver medal in 1995.

He also competed at the Olympic Games in 1988, 1992 and 1996 as well as the World Championships in 1991, 1993, 1995 and 1997 without reaching the final.

International competition record

References

External links

1965 births
Living people
Sportspeople from Santo Domingo
Puerto Rican male hurdlers
Olympic track and field athletes of Puerto Rico
Athletes (track and field) at the 1988 Summer Olympics
Athletes (track and field) at the 1992 Summer Olympics
Athletes (track and field) at the 1996 Summer Olympics
Pan American Games competitors for Puerto Rico
Athletes (track and field) at the 1987 Pan American Games
Athletes (track and field) at the 1991 Pan American Games
Athletes (track and field) at the 1999 Pan American Games
World Athletics Championships athletes for Puerto Rico
Central American and Caribbean Games gold medalists for Puerto Rico
Competitors at the 1990 Central American and Caribbean Games
Competitors at the 1993 Central American and Caribbean Games
Central American and Caribbean Games medalists in athletics